Left Revolutionary Front may refer to:

Left Revolutionary Front (Bolivia)
Revolutionary Left Front (Peru), see Revolutionary Left Movement
Left Revolutionary Front (Portugal)

See also
Left Front (disambiguation)